The Barnes Wallis Building/Wright Robinson Hall is a university building in central Manchester. It forms part of the campus of the former University of Manchester Institute of Science and Technology, which merged in 2004 with the nearby Victoria University of Manchester.

It is unusual in that the two parts of the building have different names and different uses, though the building is a single structure, purpose-built by a single architect. It was built in 1963–66 and the architect was W. A. Gibbon of Cruikshank & Seward. The building faces across a green space at the centre of campus towards the Renold Building, which was designed by the same architect and constructed the previous year. According to the Pevsner Architectural Guides: "Its scale and form was designed to relate to the earlier building. It is all white concrete. The vertical stabbing funnel on the roof is designed to light the stairs."

The low-rise structure facing onto the green space at the centre of the campus is the Barnes Wallis Building, named after the pioneering aircraft designer Sir Barnes Wallis who opened the building in 1967. This once housed the main campus refectory (closed June 2009), and until 2004 it was also home to UMIST Students' Association. For a number of years it was used by the merged University of Manchester Students' Union with a print shop, bar and shop. The building was for decades a central part of student social life. It is now largely given over to computer clusters and student workspaces, mostly used by the students of the engineering schools still resident in the former UMIST campus.

Famous from the late 1960s to late '80s amongst not just students, but also youngsters from across Manchester, for its Saturday Night Dances and Wednesday Technites. Many major rock bands played there, including The Who, The Yardbirds, Chuck Berry, Traffic, Jimi Hendrix, Def Leppard, Dr Feelgood and Nazareth. Its bar today is named Harry's Bar after the Principal of UMIST at the time Harold Hankins.

The naming of internal parts of the building was for many years a good indicator of the current political balance of the UMIST Student Union. The Large Assembly Hall was at times called the Lenin Assembly Hall. Conversely, the Small Assembly Hall was at other times named the Sharansky Assembly Hall, after Soviet dissident Natan Sharansky.

The 15-storey high-rise part of the structure is called Wright Robinson Hall, and is a student hall of residence.

In January 2021 The Guardian listed the Barnes Wallis Building as one of Britain's Brutalist buildings most at risk of demolition and development. It was included in Brutal North: Post-War Modernist Architecture in the North of England, Simon Phipps's photographic study of Brutalist architecture.

Notes

References
 Pevsner Architectural Guides — Manchester, Clare Hartwell,

External links
 Wright Robinson Hall entry on Skyscraperpage website

Buildings at the University of Manchester
University and college buildings completed in 1964
Brutalist architecture in England